Mohammed Kola Balogun (born 27 July, 1956) also called Kola Balogun or KMB is a senator of the Federal Republic of Nigeria representing Oyo South senatorial district in Oyo State. He defeated incumbent governor of Oyo State Abiola Ajimobi of the APC at the 2019 general elections for the senatorial seat.

Life
Senator Mohammed Kola Balogun  was born into the family of Mr. Ibrahim Ayinde Balogun and Mrs. Awawu Adunni. He's happily married to Mrs. Gbonju Kola-Balogun and they are blessed with children.

Educational background
Mohammed had his primary education at Ratibu Muslim Primary School, Oluyoro, Ibadan. His secondary education was at St. Peters College, Abeokuta, Ogun State. He had his University degree at the North Texas State University, Denton, Texas.

References

Living people
University of North Texas alumni
1956 births